Håkon Skaanes (born 1 September 1999) is a Norwegian cross-country skier.

Competing in four events at the 2019 Junior World Championships, his biggest successes were a fourth place in the 4 × 5 kilometre relay and the bronze medal in the sprint event. He later finished 13th in the U23 group at the 2021 Junior World Championships.

He made his World Cup debut at the December 2021 sprint in Lillehammer, also collecting his first World Cup points with a 19th place.

He represents the sports club Strindheim IL and is the son of former cross-country skier Øyvind Skaanes, and younger brother of Marte Skaanes.

Cross-countryskiing results
All results are sourced from the International Ski Federation (FIS).

World Cup

Season standings

References 

1999 births
Living people
Sportspeople from Trondheim
Norwegian male cross-country skiers